Rajeshwari Datta (born 22 September 1988) is an Indian actress. She works on the Indian cinema and TV  is known for the TV series Jamai Raja and Tujhse Hai Raabta for Zee TV.

Early life
Rajeshwari Datta was born on 22 September 1988, in Kolkata. She completed her schooling from Jorhat Assam and graduated from Jogamaya Devi College, Kolkata.

Filmography

Film
 Devdoot 2004
 Meghor sobi  2014
 Madhu Lagan

Television

Web series

References

External links
 

Living people
1986 births
Actresses from Kolkata
Indian film actresses
Actresses in Hindi television
21st-century Indian actresses
Indian television actresses